Ricardo Sarzuelo (August 4, 1957 – December 21, 2020), also known as Mark Joseph, was a Filipino former actor and chiropractor.

Early life
He was born on August 4, 1957 in Bantayan Island, Cebu, where he finished elementary. In 1974, his family went to Manila, and he studied high school in University of the East. He took Physical Therapy in University of Santo Tomas until second year college.

Career
Joseph  was introduced in Bukang Liwayway Productions' A Man Called 'Tolongges'''. He also appeared in bit roles in Get My Son, Dead Or Alive, which starred Rudy Fernandez, and Kung Tawagin Siya'y Bathala, with Dante Varona in the lead role. His first sex film was Babasagin, directed by Armando De Guzman Jr. He played the title role in the movie Bohemyo, directed by Jose "Kaka" Balagtas and starring Vida Verde, Olga Miranda, Katrina Abad and Stella Estrada. He singles out as major achievements director Elwood Perez's Silip: Daughters of Eve, produced by Solar Films, where he had scenes of frontal nudity, and the late Tata Esteban's Hubo, from FLT Films. In both movies, Joseph starred opposite Maria Isabel Lopez. Both movies had been mainstream productions, as was Maryo J. de los Reyes' Tagos Ng Dugo, where Joseph played as one of the rapists of Vilma Santos.

After a string of action movies, some of which were hits, Joseph produced his own movies, under his Rica Films. The first was Utol Ni Ben Tumbling, directed by Diego Cagahastian, and the next film Rey Guinto, Terror Hunter'', released by Harvest Films.

He ended his movie career in 1992. He studied reflexology and chirotherapy. He was a licensed chiropractor.

Death
Joseph died of a skin cancer in his home in Marikina on December 21, 2020.

Filmography
 Eva, Lason Kay Adan (2002)
 Rey Guinto, Terror Hunter (1991)
 Utol Ni Ben Tumbling (1991)
 Nektar (1988)
 Boy De Sabog (1987)
 Laruang Putik (1987)
 G.I. Baby (1987)
 Ulan, Init At Hamog (1987)
 Ginto Sa Putikan (1987)
 Amanda (1987)
 Tag-init... Nagpuputik Ang Langit (1987)
 Tagos Ng Dugo (1987)
 Hudas (1987)
 Raid Casa (1986)
 Materyales Fuertes (1986)
 Desperada (1986)
 Halik Sa Pisngi Ng Langit (1986)
 Mababangis Na Bulaklak (1986)
 Kiri (1986)
 Forgotten Warrior (1986)
 Black Diary (1986)
 Bold Star (1986)
 Jailbreak 1958 (1986)
 Dalagita (1986)
 Panganib Bawat Sandali Ng Ligaya (1986)
 Hubo Sa Dilim (1985)
 Runaway Girl (1985)
 Miguel Cordero (1985)
 Zuma (1985)
 Silip (1985)
 Bohemyo (1984)
 Wanted Driver (1984)
 Babasagin (1984)
 Muntinlupa (1984)
 Bin Mei (1982)
 Karibal Ko Ang Aking Ina (1982)
 Get My Son Dead or Alive (1982)
 A Man Called 'Tolongges' (1981)
 Kung Tawagin Siya'y Bathala (1980)

See also
Gino Antonio
Raoul Aragon

References

External links

People from Cebu City
Male actors from Cebu
University of the East alumni
20th-century Filipino male actors
Chiropractors
1957 births
2020 deaths
Filipino male film actors